Poshtkuh-e Rostam Rural District is a rural district (dehestan) in Sorna District, Rostam County, Fars Province, Iran. At the 2006 census, its population was 9,106, in 1,761 families.

References

Rostam County
rural Districts of Fars Province